Lawn Hill may refer to:

Australia 

Lawn Hill National Park, now Boodjamulla National Park, Queensland, Australia 
Lawn Hill Station, a cattle station in Queensland, formerly including the land now Boodjamulla National Park 
Lawn Hill, Queensland, a locality in the Shire of Burke
Lawn Hill crater, an impact crater in Australia

United States 
Lawn Hill, Iowa, an unincorporated community in the United States